Scopula calotis  is a moth of the family Geometridae. It is endemic to Mexico.

References

Moths described in 1912
calotis
Endemic Lepidoptera of Mexico
Moths of Central America